"I Don't Want to Change the World" is a heavy metal song by Ozzy Osbourne. It first appeared as the second track of the album No More Tears.

Though the song was not released as a commercial single, in Britain, the song was released as a promotional 12" single and a CD single (Epic XPCD 172/XPR 1745) with the tracks:
 "I Don't Want to Change the World" – 04:07  
 "Mama, I'm Coming Home" – 04:12 
 "No More Tears" – 07:24

Live version
Two years later, the song appeared in a live version on the album Live & Loud (1993). This version won Best Metal Performance at the 36th Annual Grammy Awards.

References

Ozzy Osbourne songs
1991 songs
Grammy Award for Best Metal Performance
Songs written by Ozzy Osbourne
Songs written by Zakk Wylde
Songs written by Randy Castillo
Songs written by Lemmy